Abingdon Abbey ( "St Mary's Abbey ") was a Benedictine monastery located in the centre of Abingdon-on-Thames  beside the River Thames.

The abbey was founded c.675 AD in honour of the Blessed Virgin Mary. 

The Domesday Book of 1086 informs us that the abbey was a wealthy and powerful landowner :

There is nothing to see today of the abbey church. The existing buildings include : 

 Checker Hall ( Unicorn Theatre  ). 

 The Checker. 

 The Long Gallery. 

 The Lower Hall. 

 Thames Street, the Mill and the Mill stream.

Extant buildings

There is nothing to see today of the abbey church. Apparent ruins in the Abbey Gardens are Trendell's Folly, built in the nineteenth century. Some of the stones may come from St Helen's Church.

Associated monastic buildings do, however, survive, including the Abbey Exchequer, the timber-framed Long Gallery, the Abbey bakehouse, (all in the care of the Friends of Abingdon Civic Society) the Abbey gateway, St John's hospitium (pilgrims' hostel) and the Church of St Nicolas. One of the original fireplaces was removed and is now still intact in Lacies Court, Abingdon School.

The Unicorn Theatre is now located in part of the Abbey.

History

Early history

The abbey was supposedly founded in 675 either by Cissa, viceroy of Centwine, king of the West Saxons, or by his nephew Hean, in honour of the Virgin Mary, for twelve Benedictine monks.  Cissa was buried here, as well.

Endowed by successive West Saxon kings, it grew in importance and wealth until its destruction by the Danes in the reign of King Alfred, and the sequestration of its estates by Alfred because the monks had not made him a sufficient requital for vanquishing their enemies. By the 950s the abbey was in a decayed state, but in about 954 King Eadred appointed Æthelwold, later Bishop of Winchester, abbot. He was one of the leaders of the English Benedictine Reform, and Abingdon then became the second centre of the Reform (after Glastonbury). There is a collection of 136 charters granted to this abbey by various Saxon kings. 

The Chronicle of the Monastery of Abingdon was written at the Abbey in the 12th century.

Sutton Courtenay

In Sutton Courtenay, Abingdon Abbey constructed The Abbey as a monastic grange, used as an administrative centre for the abbey's land and tithe holdings. However, the owner of the hide of land,  Alwin the priest  ( whose father owned the land before him ), agreed with the abbot that he should retain Sutton with reversion first to his son and thereafter to the abbey, on condition of giving in Milton chapelry immediately. Almost certainly in the late twelfth century, Abingdon Abbey took two thirds of the tithes and the rector the remaining third. In 1258, following a dispute, the land was formally appropriated to the abbey and a vicarage was ordained. As it was close to Abingdon Abbey, it was probably run by the monks themselves rather than being left to a steward. In 1278, however, Hugh de Courtenay, Lord of the Manor of Sutton, sued the abbey for advowson. An allegedly biased jury was impanneled and in 1284 it found unexpectedly for Courtenay. Solomon of Rochester, the chief justice of the eyre, who presided over the jury, was the first to be partitioned by the Courtenays. The abbot of Abingdon Abbey alleged that in 1290, Solomon of Rochester had seized the goods in it belonging to the abbey. He also claimed that Solomon had extorted 40 marks from the abbey for alleged dilapidations to the rectory house. He was not convicted of any offence.

Abbots

Abbots after the Norman Conquest included Faritius, physician to Henry I of England (1100–17), and Richard of Hendred, for whose appointment the King's consent was obtained in 1262. He was present at the Council of Lyon in 1272. The last abbot was Thomas Pentecost alias Rowland, who was among the first to acknowledge the Royal Supremacy. With the rest of his community he signed the surrender of his monastery in 1538, receiving the manor of Cumnor for life or until he had preferment to the extent of £223 per annum. The revenues of the Abbey (26 Hen. VIII) were valued at £1876, 10s, 9d.

Burials
Ælfric of Abingdon was originally buried here, before being translated to Canterbury Cathedral.  Sideman (bishop) was buried here, too, as were Margaret, Countess of Pembroke, and Fulk FitzRoy.

Other burials
Robert D'Oyly and his wife Ealdgyth
Siward (Abbot of Abingdon)
Ralph Basset and his father Thurston Ralph Bassett
John Grey, 2nd Viscount Lisle
Margaret, Countess of Pembroke
Mary of Waltham

See also 
 Abbot of Abingdon
 Abingdon Monks' Map
 Cosener's House, a conference centre in the grounds of the Abbey
 Abingdon School

References

Notes

Citations

Sources

External links 

Abingdon Abbey Buildings  The Friends of Abingdon Abbey Buildings Trust

Abingdon (St Mary), abbey of  Open Domesday

Sutton Courtenay  Open Domesday

7th-century establishments in England
1538 disestablishments in England
Abbey
Anglo-Saxon monastic houses
Benedictine monasteries in England
Grade I listed buildings in Oxfordshire
Grade I listed monasteries
Monasteries in Berkshire
Monasteries in Oxfordshire
Christian monasteries established in the 7th century
Monasteries dissolved under the English Reformation
Churches completed in 675
7th-century church buildings in England